The Badam (Badam) is a river of southern Kazakhstan. It is a left tributary of the Arys. It flows through the city Shymkent. One of its tributaries is the Sayramsu.

References

Rivers of Kazakhstan